Mai Po Tsuen is a village in Yuen Long District, Hong Kong.

It comprises Mai Po Lo Wai and Mai Po San Tsuen.

Administration
Mai Po Tsuen is a recognized village under the New Territories Small House Policy.

References

External links

 Delineation of area of existing village Mai Po Tsuen (San Tin) for election of resident representative (2019 to 2022)

Villages in Yuen Long District, Hong Kong
Mai Po